C12 is an untarred highway in southern Namibia. It starts in Seeheim and ends  later in Grünau. In Grünau, the B1 and B3 roads can be accessed.

Roads in Namibia
ǁKaras Region